Pollenia pseudintermedia is a species of cluster fly in the family Polleniidae.

Distribution
Greece, Israel, Italy, Macedonia, Portugal, Spain.

References

Polleniidae
Insects described in 1987
Diptera of Europe